The national chair is the leading volunteer of the National Executive Board of the Boy Scouts of America, a position comparable to the chairman of a board of directors.

Prior to 2018, the role of National Chair was titled National President. The National Chair is a member of the National Key 3 along with the National Commissioner and the Chief Scout Executive.

List

References

Citations

Sources 

 
 

Boy Scouts of America
Boy Scouts of America